KRGU-LP (97.7 FM) is a low-power FM radio station licensed to Midwest City, Oklahoma, United States. The station is currently owned by Midwest City Knights of Columbus Building Corporation

History
The station call sign KRGU-LP on April 27, 2016.

References

External links
 http://www.okcr.org

RGU-LP
Radio stations established in 2017
2017 establishments in Oklahoma
RGU-LP
Catholic Church in Oklahoma
Knights of Columbus
Midwest City, Oklahoma